Carlos Javier Weber (born 6 January 1966) is an Argentine professional volleyball coach and former player, a former member of the Argentina national team. Weber represented his native country in 3 Olympic Games in: Seoul 1988 (bronze medal), Atlanta 1996 and Sydney 2000, and took part in five World Championship editions (1986, 1990, 1994, 1998, 2002). He currently serves as head coach for the Polish PlusLiga team, Indykpol AZS Olsztyn.

Personal life
Javier Weber was born in Buenos Aires. He began playing volleyball at the age of 16 in the local club, River Plate. Weber has a son named Martín, who is also a volleyball player.

Honours

As a player
 National championships
 1997/1998  Brazilian Championship, with Ulbra/Diadora
 1998/1999  Brazilian Championship, with Ulbra/Pepsi

As a coach
 CSV South American Club Championship
  Argentina 2010 – with Drean Bolívar
  Montes Claros 2017 – with Personal Bolívar

 National championships
 2003/2004  Brazilian Championship, with Unisul/Florianópolis
 2005/2006  Greek Championship, with Panathinaikos
 2006/2007  Argentine Cup, with Bolívar Vóley
 2006/2007  Argentine Championship, with Bolívar Vóley
 2007/2008  Argentine Cup, with Bolívar Vóley
 2007/2008  Argentine Championship, with Bolívar Vóley
 2008/2009  Argentine Cup, with Bolívar Vóley
 2008/2009  Argentine Championship, with Bolívar Vóley
 2009/2010  Argentine Cup, with Bolívar Vóley
 2009/2010  Argentine Championship, with Bolívar Vóley
 2014/2015  Argentine Cup, with Bolívar Vóley
 2016/2017  Argentine Championship, with Bolívar Vóley
 2018/2019  Argentine Championship, with Bolívar Vóley
 2020/2021  Brazilian SuperCup, with Vôlei Taubaté
 2020/2021  Brazilian Championship, with Vôlei Taubaté

References

External links

 
 
 Player profile at LegaVolley.it 
 Coach profile at Volleybox.net

1966 births
Living people
Volleyball players from Buenos Aires
Argentine men's volleyball players
Argentine volleyball coaches
Volleyball coaches of international teams
Olympic volleyball players of Argentina
Volleyball players at the 1988 Summer Olympics
Medalists at the 1988 Summer Olympics
Volleyball players at the 1996 Summer Olympics
Volleyball players at the 2000 Summer Olympics
Olympic medalists in volleyball
Olympic bronze medalists for Argentina
Argentine expatriate sportspeople in Italy
Expatriate volleyball players in Italy
Argentine expatriate sportspeople in Brazil
Expatriate volleyball players in Brazil
Argentine expatriate sportspeople in Russia
Argentine expatriate sportspeople in Poland
Argentine expatriate sportspeople in the United States
AZS Olsztyn coaches
Setters (volleyball)